The Kasai Canoe Slalom Centre is a whitewater paddling venue, constructed to host the canoeing slalom events for the 2020 Summer Olympics in Tokyo. It is first artificial slalom course in Japan. The total construction cost of this venue was around 7 billion yen (about $64 million) and it has the capacity 7,500 spectators.

References

Edogawa, Tokyo
Venues of the 2020 Summer Olympics
Sports venues in Tokyo
Sports venues completed in 2019
2019 establishments in Japan
Olympic canoeing venues
Olympic kayaking venues
Artificial whitewater courses